Viro may refer to:

People
 Viro Small, African American wrestler
 Oleg Viro (born 1948), Russian mathematician
Catholicos Viro (d. 630), the leader of Caucasian Albanian Church in the early 7th century

Places
 Estonia (Viro in the Finnish language)
 Porto Viro, an Italian municipality
 Viro, Estonia, a village in Setomaa Parish, Võru County, Estonia

Other uses
 Viro (company), a Croatian sugar company
 Viro (Elemental Gelade), fictional character the manga series Elemental Gelade